The Långå wind park is a wind park in Långåvålen near the village of Långå in Härjedalen Municipality, Jämtland County, Sweden.  It was built at a cost of 125 million Swedish kronor by Agrivind AB of Västergötland.

The park has five units (Långå 1 - 5), each German-manufactured Enercon turbines rated at 2000 kW.  The turbines have a tower height of 85 m and a total height of 125 m.

See also

 List of wind farms in Sweden

References

Wind farms in Sweden